Opacifrons is a genus of flies belonging to the family Lesser Dung flies.

Species
O. aequalis (Grimshaw, 1901)
O. bisecta (Malloch, 1914)
O. brevisecunda Papp, 1991
O. brevistylus Marshall & Langstaff, 1998
O. convexa (Spuler, 1924)
O. coxata (Stenhammar, 1855)
O. cubita Marshall & Langstaff, 1998
O. differentialis Su, Liu & Xu, 2013
O. digna (Roháček, 1982)
O. distorta Marshall & Langstaff, 1998
O. dupliciseta (Duda, 1925)
O. elbergi (Papp, 1979)
O. ghesquierei Vanschuytbroeck, 1951
O. inornata Marshall & Langstaff, 1998
O. liupanensis (Su & Liu, 2009)
O. maculifrons (Becker, 1907)
O. mirabilis (Papp, 1973)
O. moravica (Roháček, 1975)
O. niveohalterata (Duda, 1925)
O. obunca Marshall & Langstaff, 1998
O. orbicularis (Becker, 1920)
O. parabisecta Marshall & Langstaff, 1998
O. pavicula Marshall & Langstaff, 1998
O. prominentia Su, Liu & Xu, 2013
O. pseudimpudica (Deeming, 1969)
O. quadrispinosa Marshall & Langstaff, 1998
O. quarta Marshall & Langstaff, 1998
O. redunca Marshall & Langstaff, 1998
O. rubrifrons (Vanschuytbroeck, 1950)
O. simplisterna Marshall & Langstaff, 1998
O. spatulata Marshall & Langstaff, 1998
O. triloba Marshall & Langstaff, 1998

References

Sphaeroceridae
Diptera of Africa
Diptera of Asia
Diptera of South America
Diptera of North America
Diptera of Australasia
Taxa named by Oswald Duda
Brachycera genera